Víctor Oswaldo Fuentes Solís (born 27 May 1975) is a Mexican politician affiliated with the PAN. He currently serves as Deputy of the LXII Legislature of the Mexican Congress representing Nuevo León, and previously served in the Congress of Nuevo León.

References

1975 births
Living people
Politicians from Monterrey
Members of the Chamber of Deputies (Mexico) for Nuevo León
National Action Party (Mexico) politicians
21st-century Mexican politicians
Members of the Congress of Nuevo León
Universidad Regiomontana alumni
Deputies of the LXII Legislature of Mexico
Members of the Senate of the Republic (Mexico) for Nuevo León